is a town in the district of Salzlandkreis, in Saxony-Anhalt, Germany. It is situated on the right bank of the river Saale, approx. 15 km south of Bernburg, and 25 km northwest of Halle (Saale).

Geography 
The town Könnern consists of Könnern proper and ten Ortschaften or municipal divisions. These Ortschaften are former municipalities, absorbed into Könnern between 2003 and 2010:

Beesenlaublingen
Belleben
Cörmigk
Edlau
Gerlebogk
Golbitz
Lebendorf
Strenznaundorf
Wiendorf
Zickeritz

References

Towns in Saxony-Anhalt
Salzlandkreis